Lawrence Howard Douglas (June 5, 1890 – November 4, 1949) was a Major League Baseball pitcher who played for the Baltimore Terrapins of the Federal League in .

External links

1890 births
1949 deaths
Baltimore Terrapins players
Martinsburg Champs players
Wheeling Stogies players
Major League Baseball pitchers
Baseball players from Tennessee
People from Jellico, Tennessee